Hidden Springs is a master-planned community and census-designated place  in the Dry Creek Valley of Ada County, Idaho. Its population was 2,280 as of the 2010 census.

The community manages more than 800 acres of permanently preserved open space and its own wastewater treatment facility.

Architecture is primarily in a neo-traditional style, with many homes having garages accessible through rear alleys. The result is a neighborhood that is generally more pedestrian-friendly than the typical suburban subdivision.

Education
The area is in Boise School District. Hidden Springs Elementary School is located within the neighborhood.

In addition to that elementary school, Hidden Springs is zoned to Hillside Junior High School and Boise High School.

Demographics

References

Census-designated places in Ada County, Idaho
Census-designated places in Idaho